Favstar (also known as favstar.fm) was an online service that tracked Twitter use. Favstar used an API to rank Tweets by popularity according to metrics like Favorites and Retweets.

Favstar shut down on June 19, 2018, after the API that it relied on was deprecated. A similar service was launched shortly after with LikeFluence.

References

External Links
 LikeFluence

Twitter services and applications
Internet properties established in 2009
Internet properties disestablished in 2018